This article lists political parties in Ghana.

Ghana has a multi-party system, However, there are two dominant political parties (the National Democratic Congress and the New Patriotic Party), with extreme difficulty for anyone to achieve electoral success under the banner of any other party.

Regulation
Political parties in Ghana are regulated under the Political Parties Act 574 passed in 2000. This spells out how political parties may be founded, registered and operated. It also specifies how political parties may be funded in Ghana.

The parties in Ghana

Fourth Republic (1992-present)
As at October 2020, there are 29 political parties listed on the website of the Electoral Commission of Ghana. Of these, a total of 11 parties indicated their willingness to participate in the political programmes by the state broadcaster, Ghana Broadcasting Corporation leading up to the 2020 Ghanaian general election. In 2018, there were 24 political parties listed on the website. There were 30 registered political parties on the list of the Electoral Commission of Ghana during the Fourth Republic in 2012.

Parliamentary parties

Other active parties
(*Parties in bold have indicated some degree of involvement with 2020 general election)

All People's Congress (APC), founded 2016, split from People's National Convention.
Convention People's Party (CPP) - Nkrumah tradition, formed 12 June 1949, banned 1966, reformed 1996 from other Nkrumah tradition parties
Democratic Freedom Party (DFP) - founded 2006, merged with the National Democratic Congress in 2012
Democratic People's Party (DPP) - founded 1992
Every Ghanaian Living Everywhere (EGLE Party) - founded 1992
Great Consolidated Popular Party (GCPP) - founded 1995
Ghana Democratic Republican Party (GDRP) - founded 1992
Ghana Freedom Party (GFP) - founded 2012
Ghana National Party (GNP) - founded 2007
Ghana Union Movement (GUM) - founded 2019
Liberal Party of Ghana (LPG) founded 2017
National Democratic Party (NDP) - founded October 2012, split from NDC
National Reform Party (NRP) -founded 1999, split from NDC
New Vision Party (NVP) - founded 2008
People's Action Party (PAP)
People's Destiny Party (PDP)
People's National Convention (PNC) - founded 1992
Power Unity Party (PUP)
Progressive People's Party (PPP) - founded 2012
Reformed Patriotic Democrats (RPD) - founded 2007
United Democratic Party (UDP)
United Development System Party (UDSP) - founded 2012
United Front Party (UFP) - founded 2011
United Ghana Movement (UGM) - founded 1996
United Progressive Party (UPP) - founded 2016
United Renaissance Party (URP) - founded 2007
Yes People's Party (YPP) - founded 2012

Inactive parties
Ghana Redevelopment Party (GRP)
Independent People's Party (IPP) - founded 2011 and dissolved 2017
National Convention Party (NCP) - merged with PCP to reform CPP in 1996
National Independence Party (NIP) - merged with PHP in 1993, forming PCP
People's Convention Party (PCP) - founded in 1993, merged with NCP to reform CPP in 1996
People's Heritage Party (PHP)- merged with NIP in 1993, forming PCP
United Love Party (ULP) - founded 2008

Third Republic (1979-1981)
Action Congress Party
All People's Party (APP) - Merger of the parties in opposition- PFP, UNC, SDF and TFP
People's National Party (PNP) - Nkrumah tradition
Popular Front Party - Danquah/Busia tradition (PFP)
Social Democratic Front (SDF)
Third Force Party (TFP)
United National Convention (UNC)

Second Republic (1969-1972)
All People's Republican Party (APRP)
Justice Party (JP)
National Alliance of Liberals (NAL) - offshoot of CPP as CPP was banned
People's Action Party (PAP)
Progress Party (PP) - Danquah/Busia tradition
United Nationalist Party (UNP)

Independent State within the Commonwealth (1957-1960)/First Republic (1960-1966)
Convention People's Party (CPP) - Nkrumah tradition
United Party (UP) - Danquah-Busia tradition
United Gold Coast Convention (UGCC) -'Grant-Johnson'

Pre-Independence
Anlo Youth Organization
Convention People's Party (CPP) - Nkrumah tradition, split from UGCC
Federation of Youth Organization (FYO)
Ghana Congress Party (GCP)
Muslim Association Party (MAP)
National Liberation Movement (NLM)
Northern People's Party (NPP)
Togoland Congress (TG)
United Gold Coast Convention (UGCC) - Danquah/Busia tradition

See also
Electoral Commission of Ghana
Lists of political parties
List of political parties in Western Africa by country
List of political parties by United Nations geoscheme

References

External links
National Electoral Commission - Registered Political Parties
Political Parties: A Cross-National Survey
Political Parties and Political Participation in Ghana
African Democracy Encyclopaedia Project - Ghana: Political Parties registered for 2012 elections
Political parties in Ghana, their emblems and colours

Ghana
 
Political parties
Political parties
Ghana